Contemporary art museums around the world specialize in collecting and exhibiting contemporary art.  The following is an alphabetical listing of major contemporary art museums, divided by country. A number of such museums are named Museum of Contemporary Art.

Argentina
 Museum of Contemporary Art of Rosario, Rosario

Armenia
 Cafesjian Museum of Art

Australia 
 Artspace Visual Arts Centre, Sydney
 Australian Centre for Contemporary Art (ACCA), Melbourne
 Gallery of Modern Art, Brisbane (GOMA, part of QAGOMA), Brisbane
 Monash University Museum of Art (MUMA), Melbourne
 Museum of Contemporary Art Australia (MCA), Sydney
 Museum of Old and New Art, Hobart

Austria 
 Albertina Modern (part of the Albertina), Vienna
 21er Haus, Vienna
 Mumok, Vienna
 The Heidi Horten Collection, Vienna

Belgium
 Museum of Contemporary Art, Antwerp
 KANAL — Centre Pompidou, Brussels
 Stedelijk Museum voor Actuele Kunst, Ghent

Bosnia and Herzegovina
 MSURS Muzej Savremene Umjetnosti (Museum of Contemporary Art), Banja Luka

Brazil 
Inhotim
Museum of Contemporary Art, University of São Paulo
Niterói Contemporary Art Museum
MACS - Museu de Arte Contemporânea de Sorocaba

Canada 
 Art Gallery of Ontario
 Contemporary Art Gallery (Vancouver)
 Musée d'art contemporain de Montréal
  (in French)
 Museum of Contemporary Art Toronto Canada
 Vancouver Art Gallery
 Remai Modern (Saskatoon)

Chile
 Santiago Museum of Contemporary Art, Santiago
 Museum of Contemporary Art, Valdivia, Valdivia

China 
 Museum of Contemporary Art Shanghai, Shanghai
 Sifang Art Museum, Nanjing
 Power Station of Art, Shanghai
 Ullens Center for Contemporary Art, Beijing
 MoCA - Museum of Contemporary Art, Beijing

Croatia 
 Museum of Contemporary Art, Zagreb

Czech Republic 
 DOX Museum of Contemporary Art

Finland 
 Kiasma, Helsinki
 EMMA, Espoo
 Amos Rex, Helsinki

France 
 Musée d'art moderne et contemporain de Saint-Étienne Métropole, Saint-Priest-en-Jarez
 Château de Montsoreau-Museum of Contemporary Art, Montsoreau
 Lille Métropole Museum of Modern, Contemporary and Outsider Art, Villeneuve d'Ascq
 Centre Georges Pompidou, Paris
 Musée d'Art Moderne de la Ville de Paris, Paris
 Musée d'Art Contemporain du Val-de-Marne, Vitry-sur-Seine
 Centre Pompidou-Metz, Metz
 CAPC musée d'art contemporain de Bordeaux, Bordeaux
 Collection Lambert, Avignon
 Les Abattoirs, Musée - Frac Occitanie Toulouse, Toulouse
 Musée d'art moderne et d'art contemporain, Nice
 , Sérignan

Germany 
 Deichtorhallen, Hamburg
 Hamburger Bahnhof, Berlin
 Museum für Moderne Kunst, Frankfurt
 Museum Insel Hombroich, Neuss

Greece 
 National museum of Contemporary Art, Athens
 State Museum of Contemporary Arts, Thessaloniki
 Macedonian Museum of Contemporary Art, Thessaloniki

Hungary 
 Ludwig Museum, Museum of Contemporary Art, Budapest

Hong Kong 
 M+
Hong Kong Arts Centre
Hong Kong Museum of Art

Iran 
 Museum of Contemporary Art, Isfahan
 Tehran Museum of Contemporary Art

Israel 
 Tel Aviv Museum of Art

Italy 
 Peggy Guggenheim Collection, Venice
 Museum of Contemporary Art of Rome, Rome
 MAXXI – National Museum of the 21st Century Arts, Rome
 Galleria Nazionale d'Arte Moderna, Rome
 Galleria Comunale d'Arte Moderna, Rome, Rome
 Padiglione d'Arte Contemporanea, Milan
 Triennale, Milan
 Museo del Novecento, Milan
 Museum of Modern and Contemporary Art of Trento and Rovereto, Trento
 Castello di Rivoli - Museum of Contemporary Art, Turin
 Galleria Civica d'Arte Moderna e Contemporanea, Turin
 Centro per l'arte contemporanea Luigi Pecci, Prato
 Museum of Contemporary Art Villa Panza, Varese
 Palazzo Grassi / Punta della Dogana (Pinault Collection), Venice
 Palazzo delle Arti, Naples
 Museo d'Arte Contemporanea Donnaregina (MADRE), Naples
 Casoria Contemporary Art Museum (CAM), Casoria
 Museo d'Arte Moderna di Bologna (MAMBO), Bologna
 Museo del Novecento, Castel Sant'Elmo, Naples
 CCC Strozzina - Centre for Contemporary Culture, Florence
 Museo Marino Marini, Florence
 Raccolta d'Arte Contemporanea Alberto della Ragione, Florence
 Galleria d'Arte Moderna e Contemporanea, Bergamo
 Kunst Merano Arte, Merano
 Museo d'Arte Gallarate MAGA, Gallarate
 Museo d'Arte Contemporanea Villa Croce, Genoa
 Museion (Museo d'Arte Contemporanea), Bolzano
 Centro Sperimentale per le Arti Contemporanee Cesac, Cuneo
 Centro Arti Visive Pescheria, Pesaro
 MAN - Museo d'Arte di Nuoro, Nuoro
 GCAC - Galleria Comunale d'Arte Contemporanea, Arezzo
 MACS - Museo d'Arte Contemporanea, Catania
 GAMC - Gallerie d'Arte Moderna e Contemporanea, Ferrara
 MUDAC – Museo di Arte Contemporanea, Floridia
 Museo d'Arte Contemporanea, Gibellina
 Lucca Center of Contemporary Art, Lucca
 RISO - Museo d'Arte Contemporanea della Sicilia, Palermo
 Museo d'Arte Contemporanea e del Novecento, Monsummano
 Museo Sperimentale d'Arte Contemporanea, L'Aquila
 CAMeC - Centro d'Arte Moderna e Contemporanea, La Spezia
 Museo d'Arte Contemporanea, Lissone
 MACA - Museo d'Arte Contemporanea Acri, Acri
 Galleria d'Arte Contemporanea, Assisi
 MdAO - Museo d'Arte, Avellino
 Museo d'Arte Contemporanea Sannio, Benevento
 Museo d'Arte Contemporanea, Fonte Nuova
 Stazione dell'Arte, Ulassai

Japan 
 Museum of Contemporary Art, Tokyo
 Mori Art Museum, Tokyo
 21st Century Museum of Contemporary Art, Kanazawa
 Chichu Art Museum, Naoshima

Liechtenstein 
 Kunstmuseum Liechtenstein, Vaduz

Jordan 
 Jordan National Gallery of Fine Arts

México 
 Museo de Arte contemporaneo, Monterrey
 Museo Jumex, Mexico City
 Museo Rufino Tamayo, Mexico City
 Museo Universitario Arte Contemporáneo, Mexico City
 Museo de Arte Moderno, Mexico City
 Museo de Arte Carrillo Gil
 Museum of Contemporary Art (Aguascalientes), Aguascalientes
 Museo Morelense de Arte Contemporáneo Juan Soriano, Cuernavaca, Morelos

Morocco
 Museum of Contemporary Art (Tangier), Morocco

Netherlands 
 Bonnefantenmuseum, Maastricht
 Centraal Museum, Utrecht
 Cobra Museum, Amstelveen
 De Pont Museum of Contemporary Art, Tilburg
 Gemeentemuseum Den Haag, The Hague
 Groninger Museum, Groningen
 Kröller-Müller Museum, Otterloo
 Kunsthal, Rotterdam
 Museum Boijmans Van Beuningen, Rotterdam
 Singer Laren, Laren
 Stedelijk Museum, Amsterdam
 Stedelijk Museum 's-Hertogenbosch, 's-Hertogenbosch
 Van Abbemuseum, Eindhoven
 Van Gogh Museum, Amsterdam

Norway 
 Astrup Fearnley Museum of Modern Art, Oslo

Panama 
 Panama Museum of Contemporary Art, Panama City

Philippines
 Museum of Contemporary Art and Design, Manila
 Metropolitan Museum of Manila
 The Museum at De La Salle University
 Iloilo Museum of Contemporary Art, Iloilo City

Poland
 Museum of Modern Art, Warsaw
 Zachęta, Warsaw
 Ujazdów Castle, Warsaw
 Centre for Contemporary Art Elektrownia, Radom
 Museum of Contemporary Art, Radom
 Center of Contemporary Art in Toruń
 Łaźnia Centre for Contemporary Art, Gdańsk
 MOCAK Museum of Contemporary Art, Krakow
 Art Museum, Łódź (one of the oldest museums of modern art in the world, opened in 1931)
 Wrocław Contemporary Museum

Portugal 
 Soares dos Reis National Museum
 National Museum of Contemporary Art (Portugal) (Museu do Chiado)
 Museu Fundação Serralves
 José Malhoa Museum
 Museu da Fundação Arpad Szenes - Vieira da Silva
 Museus Colecção Berardo - Centro Cultural de Belém
 Museus de Arte Contemporânea de Elvas (MACE)
 Museu do Design e da Moda (MUDE)
 Centro de Arte Contemporânea Graça Morais
 Museu Municipal Amadeo de Souza Cardoso
 Atelier-Museu Júlio Pomar
 Casa das Histórias Paula Rego
 Museu da Arte, Arquitetura e Tecnologia

Puerto Rico
 Puerto Rico Museum of Contemporary Art, San Juan

Romania 
 National Museum of Contemporary Art, Bucharest
 Kunsthaus 7 B, Cisnadioara, Sibiu / Romania

Russia 
 ART4.RU Contemporary Art Museum, Moscow
 Erarta, Saint Petersburg
 Garage Museum of Contemporary Art, Moscow
 MAGMA, Moscow
 Moscow House of Photography, Moscow
 Moscow Museum of Modern Art, Moscow
 Multimedia Art Museum, Moscow
 National Centre for Contemporary Arts, Moscow
 New Tretyakov Gallery, Moscow
 Winzavod Center for Contemporary Art, Moscow

Serbia 
 Museum of Contemporary Art, Belgrade

Singapore 
 Singapore Art Museum

South Korea
National Museum of Modern and Contemporary Art, Seoul

Spain 
 CAAC, Seville
 CAAM, Las Palmas de Gran Canaria
  (CA2M), Móstoles
 Centro de Documentación y Estudios Avanzados de Arte Contemporáneo (CENDEAC), Murcia
 Centre d'Art La Panera, Lleida
 Centre d´Art Santa Mónica, Barcelona
 Centro de Arte Contemporáneo Huarte, Huarte
 Centro Cultural Montehermoso, Vitoria-Gasteiz
 Centro José Guerrero, Cádiz
  (CGAC), Santiago de Compostela
 Es Baluard, Palma
 Guggenheim Museum Bilbao, Bilbao
 Fundació Antoni Tàpies, Barcelona
 Fundació Joan Miró, Barcelona
 Instituto Valenciano de Arte Moderno (IVAM), Valencia
 , San Sebastian
 La Casa Encendida, Madrid
 Museo de Arte Contemporáneo (MAC), A Coruña
 MACBA, Barcelona
 MARCO, Vigo
 Museo Extremeño e Iberoamericano de Arte Contemporáneo, Badajoz
 MUSAC, León
 , Alzuza
 Museo de Arte Contemporáneo (Madrid)
 Museo de Escultura al Aire Libre de Alcalá de Henares
 , Valladolid
 MNCARS, Madrid
 Real Academia de Bellas Artes de San Fernando, Madrid
 Sala Rekalde, Bilbao
 Tabakalera, San Sebastian

Sweden 
 Moderna Museet
 Moderna Museet Malmö

Switzerland 
 Aargauer Kunsthaus
 Kunstmuseum Appenzell
 Kunstmuseum Basel
 Museum of Contemporary Art (Basel)
 Kunstmuseum Bern
 Zentrum Paul Klee, Bern

 Bündner Kunstmuseum
 Kirchner Museum Davos
 Musée d'Art moderne et contemporain (MAMCO), Geneva
 Kunsthaus Glarus
 Kunstmuseum Luzern
 Kunstmuseum Olten
 Museum zu Allerheiligen, Schaffhausen
 
 Kunstmuseum Solothurn
 Kunstmuseum St. Gallen
 Kunstmuseum Thun
 Kunstmuseum Thurgau
 Fotomuseum Winterthur
 Kunsthaus Zug
 Kunsthaus Zürich

Taiwan
 Museum of Contemporary Art Taipei, Taipei
Taipei Fine Arts Museum, Taipei
National Taiwan Museum of Fine Arts, Taichung
Kaohsiung Museum Of Fine Arts, Kaohsiung

Thailand 
 Bangkok Art and Culture Centre
 Museum of Contemporary Art (MOCA), Bangkok

Turkey
 Borusan Contemporary 
Doğançay Museum
 Istanbul Museum of Modern Art
 Istanbul Contemporary Art Museum (iS.CaM.)
 SALT (institution)
 Elgiz Museum (Proje4L)

United Arab Emirates 
 Maraya Art Centre, Sharjah

Ukraine
 National Art Museum of Ukraine, Kyiv
 Khanenko Museum, Kyiv
 National gallery of Kiev, Kyiv
 Mystetskyi Arsenal National Art and Culture Museum Complex, Kyiv
 Lviv National Art Gallery, Lviv
 Lviv National Museum, Lviv 
 Lviv Museum of Ethnography, Lviv

United Kingdom 
 Tate (formerly known as the Tate Gallery, Liverpool, London and St Ives)
 Arnolfini, Bristol
 BALTIC Centre for Contemporary Art (also known as the Baltic Flour Mill)
 Institute of Contemporary Arts, London
 Whitechapel Gallery, London
 Gallery of Modern Art, Glasgow
 Nottingham Contemporary, Nottingham 
 Tramway, Glasgow
 National Galleries of Scotland, Edinburgh
 Middlesbrough Institute of Modern Art, Middlesbrough

United States 

 Albright-Knox Art Gallery, Buffalo, New York
 The Aldrich Contemporary Art Museum, Ridgefield, Connecticut
 Artspace, New Haven, Connecticut
 Artpace, San Antonio,  Texas
 Aspen Art Museum, Aspen, Colorado
 Atlanta Contemporary Art Center, Atlanta, Georgia
 Bechtler Museum of Modern Art, Charlotte, North Carolina
 Boulder Museum of Contemporary Art, Boulder, Colorado
 Blaffer Art Museum at the University of Houston, Houston, Texas
 Blue Star Contemporary Art Museum, San Antonio, Texas
 The Broad, Los Angeles, California
 Contemporary Art Museum of Raleigh, Raleigh, North Carolina
 Contemporary Art Museum St. Louis, St. Louis, Missouri
 Contemporary Arts Center, Cincinnati, Ohio
 Contemporary Arts Museum Houston, Houston, Texas
 Contemporary Museum Baltimore, Baltimore, Maryland
 The Delaware Contemporary, Wilmington, Delaware 
 Dia: Beacon, Beacon, New York
Glenstone, Potomac, Maryland
 Halsey Institute of Contemporary Art, Charleston, South Carolina
 Hammer Museum, Los Angeles, California
 Henry Art Gallery, Seattle, Washington
 Hirshhorn Museum and Sculpture Garden, Washington, D.C.
 Honolulu Museum of Art Spalding House, Honolulu, Hawaii
 Institute of Contemporary Art, Boston, Boston, Massachusetts
 Institute of Contemporary Art, Los Angeles, Los Angeles, California
 Institute of Contemporary Art, Miami, Miami, Florida
 Institute of Contemporary Art, Philadelphia, Philadelphia, Pennsylvania
 Kemper Museum of Contemporary Art, Kansas City, Missouri
 KMAC Museum, Louisville, Kentucky
 Madison Museum of Contemporary Art, Madison, Wisconsin 
 Mattress Factory, Pittsburgh, Pennsylvania
 Massachusetts Museum of Contemporary Art, North Adams, Massachusetts
 Modern Art Museum of Fort Worth, Fort Worth, Texas
 Museum of Contemporary Art, Chicago, Chicago, Illinois
 Museum of Contemporary Art, Cleveland, Cleveland, Ohio
 Museum of Contemporary Art Denver, Denver, Colorado
 Museum of Contemporary Art Detroit, Detroit, Michigan
 Museum of Contemporary Art of Georgia, Atlanta, Georgia
 Museum of Contemporary Art Jacksonville, Jacksonville, Florida
 Museum of Contemporary Art, Los Angeles, Los Angeles, California
 Museum of Contemporary Art, North Miami, Miami, Florida
 Museum of Contemporary Art, San Diego, San Diego, California
 Museum of Contemporary Art Santa Barbara, Santa Barbara, California 
 Museum of Contemporary Art, Tucson, Tucson, Arizona
 Museum of Contemporary Art, Westport, Westport, Connecticut
 Museum of Modern Art, New York City, New York
 Nerman Museum of Contemporary Art, Overland Park, Kansas
 New Museum of Contemporary Art, New York City, New York
 Orange County Museum of Art, Newport Beach, California
 Pérez Art Museum Miami, Miami, Florida
 P.S. 1 Contemporary Art Center, New York City, New York
 The Renaissance Society, Chicago, Illinois
 Rose Art Museum, Waltham, Massachusetts
 Rubell Museum, Miami, Florida
 Rubell Museum DC, Washington, D.C.
 San Francisco Museum of Modern Art, San Francisco, California
 San Jose Institute of Contemporary Art, San Jose California
Solomon R. Guggenheim Museum, New York City, New York 
SCAD Museum of Art, Savannah, Georgia
 Scottsdale Museum of Contemporary Art, Scottsdale, Arizona
 SITE Santa Fe, Santa Fe, New Mexico
 Southeastern Center for Contemporary Art, Winston-Salem, North Carolina
 Station Museum of Contemporary Art, Houston, Texas
 Storm King Art Center, New Windsor, New York
The Contemporary Austin, Austin, Texas
 Tube Factory artspace, Indianapolis, Indiana
University Museum of Contemporary Art, Amherst, Massachusetts
Utah Museum of Contemporary Art, Salt Lake City, Utah
 Virginia Museum of Contemporary Art, Virginia Beach, Virginia
 Walker Art Center, Minneapolis, Minnesota
 Weisman Art Museum, Minneapolis, Minnesota
 Whitney Museum of American Art, New York City, New York

References

Further reading
 Jesus Pedro Lorente, Cathedrals of urban modernity: the first museums of contemporary art, 1800-1930, Ashgate (1998).
 Jesus Pedro Lorente, The Museums of Contemporary Art: Notion and Development, Ashgate (2011).
 Bruce Altshuler, Collecting the new: museums and contemporary art, Princeton University Press (2007).
 Claire Bishop, Radical Museology or, What's Contemporary in Museums of Contemporary Art? Koenig Books (2013).

 

8
Lists of art museums and galleries
Arts-related lists